Nancy I. Williams is an American kinesiologist who is a professor at Pennsylvania State University. Her research considers the physiological mechanisms that underpin energy balance, exercise performance and bone health. She is a former president of the American Kinesiology Association and Fellow of the American College of Sports Medicine.

Early life and education 
Williams is from New Jersey. She attended Shawnee High School. Williams studied biology at Bucknell University before moving to Ohio State University for a graduate degree. Williams moved to the Boston University for her doctoral research, where she focussed on anatomy and physiology. After earning her doctoral degree, Williams moved to the University of Pittsburgh, where she worked as a postdoctoral researcher in reproductive sciences.

Research and career 
Williams studies women's health and exercise. In 1997, Williams joined the faculty at Pennsylvania State University, where she was promoted to full professor in 2009. In 2012 Williams was made Head of Department of Kinesiology at the Pennsylvania State University College of Health and Human Development. Her research includes randomized controlled trials to understand the female athlete triad. She has shown that up to 60% of women recreational athletes experience menstrual dysfunction. She has explored how weight loss impacts the acute-exercise induced suppression of appetite. She serves on the Board of Directors of the Female and Male Athlete Triad.

In 2019 Williams was elected President of the American Kinesiology Association.

Awards and honours 

 1994 National Institutes of Health Individual National Research Service Award
 1998 Elected Fellow of the American College of Sports Medicine
 2001 Department of Defense Breast Cancer Research Program Career Development Award
 2011 Elected Fellow of the National Academy of Kinesiology

Selected publications

References 

Sports scientists
Bucknell University alumni
Boston University alumni
Ohio State University alumni
Pennsylvania State University faculty
People from Burlington County, New Jersey
Shawnee High School (New Jersey) alumni
Year of birth missing (living people)
Living people